Tradescantia occidentalis, the prairie spiderwort or western spiderwort, is a plant in the dayflower family, Commelinaceae.  It is common and widespread across the western Great Plains of the United States, as well as in Arizona, New Mexico, southern Utah, and Sonora, but is listed as a threatened species in Canada.

Like in a few other species of Tradescantia, the cells of the stamen hairs of Western spiderwort are normally colored blue, but when exposed to neutron radiation or other forms of ionizing radiation, the cells mutate and change color to pink.  Thus the plant can be used as a bioassay for radiation.

Gallery

References

External links

occidentalis
Flora of Western Canada
Plants described in 1896
Flora of the North-Central United States
Flora of the South-Central United States
Flora of the Southwestern United States
Flora of the Northwestern United States
Flora of the Southeastern United States